Alibek Buleshev is a Kazakhstani football forward born on 9 April 1981 who plays for Okzhetpes. He is the all-time top scorer of Kairat.

Career

Club
On 30 September 2016, Buleshev had his contract with FC Okzhetpes terminated by mutual consent.

In June 2017 Buleshev left FC Ordabasy, to rejoin Okzhetpes

Career statistics

Club

International

Honours
Kairat
 Kazakhstan Premier League (1): 2004
 Kazakhstan Cup (3): 1999–00, 2001, 2003
Aktobe
 Kazakhstan Premier League (1): 2007,
Atyrau
 Kazakhstan Cup (1): 2009

References

External links
 
 

1981 births
Living people
Kazakhstani footballers
Kazakhstan international footballers
Kazakhstan Premier League players
FC Kairat players
FC Aktobe players
FC Taraz players
FC Okzhetpes players
FC Ordabasy players
FC Zhetysu players
People from Taldykorgan
Association football forwards